The Bob Dylan Archive is a collection of documents and objects relating to American singer Bob Dylan. It was announced on March 2, 2016 that the archive had been acquired by the George Kaiser Family Foundation (GKFF) and The University of Tulsa (TU). It will be under the care of the University's Helmerich Center for American Research.

The archive consists of more than 6,000 items, including notebooks, contracts, unreleased concert films and the leather jacket Dylan wore at the 1965 Newport Folk Festival. Most of the material has never before been seen by members of the public; it will now be made available for research and will form the basis of public exhibitions. The Woody Guthrie Centre Archives were purchased earlier by the GKFF and are already housed in Tulsa.

Dylan is quoted as saying "I'm glad that my archives, which have been collected all these years, have finally found a home and are to be included with the works of Woody Guthrie and especially alongside all the valuable artifacts from the Native American Nations. To me it makes a lot of sense and it's a great honor."

Preservation

As of March 16, 2016, nearly 1,000 items from the Archive had been brought to the Hardesty Archival Center inside the Helmerich Center, to be preserved and digitally recorded. The remainder of the archive will be brought to Tulsa from various locations over the next two years.

References

External links

Bob Dylan
Music archives in the United States
Archives in the United States
University of Tulsa